Sir William may refer to:
 Sir William (horse), a British Thoroughbred racehorse
 Bill Dundee (born 1943), Scottish born-Australian professional wrestler
 "(Little) Sir William", an alternative name of the folk song "Sir Hugh"

See also 
 William (disambiguation)